A one-way wave equation is a first-order partial differential equation describing one wave traveling in a direction defined by the vector wave velocity. It contrasts with the second-order two-way wave equation describing a standing wavefield resulting from superposition of two waves in opposite directions. In the one-dimensional case, the one-way wave equation allows wave propagation to be calculated without the mathematical complication of solving a 2nd order differential equation. Due to the fact that in the last decades no 3D one-way wave equation could be found numerous approximation methods based on the 1D one-way wave equation are used for 3D seismic and other geophysical calculations, see also the section .

One-dimensional case
The scalar second-order (two-way) wave equation describing a standing wavefield can be written as:

Due to the ambiguity in the direction of the wave velocity, the equation does not contain information about the wave direction and therefore has solutions propagating in both the forward and backward directions. The general solution of the equation is the summation of the solutions in these two directions is:  

When a one-way wave problem is formulated, the wave propagation direction has to be (manually) selected by keeping one of the two terms in the general solution.  

Factoring the operator on the left side of the equation yields a pair of one-way wave equations, one with solutions that propagate forwards and the other with solutions that propagate backwards.

The forward- and backward-travelling waves are described respectively,

The one-way wave equations can also be physically derived directly from specific acoustic impedance. 

In a longitudinal plane wave, the specific impedance determines the local proportionality of pressure  and particle velocity :

with  = density.

The conversion of the impedance equation leads to:

A longitudinal plane wave of angular frequency  has the displacement . 

The pressure  and the particle velocity  can be expressed in terms of the displacement  (: Elastic Modulus):

 for the 1D case this is in full analogy to stress  in mechanics: , with strain being defined as  

These relations inserted into the equation above yield:

 

With the local wave velocity definition (speed of sound): 

directly(!) follows the 1st-order partial differential equation of the one-way wave equation: 

For wave propagation in the direction of  the unique solution is 

and for wave propagation in the  direction the respective solution is

There also exists a spherical one-way wave equation describing the wave propagation of a monopole sound source in spherical coordinates, i.e., in radial direction. By a modification of the radial nabla operator an inconsistency between spherical divergence and Laplace operators is solved and the resulting solution does not show Bessel functions (in contrast to the known solution of the conventional two-way approach).

Three-dimensional case
The one-way equation and solution in the three-dimensional case was assumed to be similar way as for the one-dimensional case by a mathematical decomposition (factorization) of a 2nd order differential equation. In fact, the 3D One-way wave equation can be derived from first principles: a) derivation from impedance theorem  and  b) derivation from a tensorial impulse flow equilibrium in a field point.

Inhomogeneous media
For inhomogeneous media with location-dependent elasticity module , density  and wave velocity  an analytical solution of the one-way wave equation can be derived by introduction of a new field variable.

Further mechanical and electromagnetic waves
The method of PDE factorization can also be transferred to other 2nd or 4th order wave equations, e.g. transversal, and string, Moens/Korteweg, bending, and electromagnetic wave equations and electromagnetic waves.

See also

References 

Geophysics
Wave mechanics
Acoustics
Sound
Continuum mechanics